The French Orthodox Church (FOC; , EOF) is a self-governing Western Orthodox church formed in 1975. The church's current first hierarch is Bishop Martin (Laplaud), the abbot of the Orthodox Monastery of St Michel du Var. The EOF has communities in France, Brazil, and the French-speaking Caribbean.

Relations with other churches
The French Orthodox Church is in full communion with the Orthodox Church of the Gauls and the Celtic Orthodox Church through the Communion of Western Orthodox Churches, since its establishment on 25 December 2007.

External links
 

Western Rite Orthodoxy
Christian denominations founded in France